Chingford Green Ward is a political division of the London Borough of Waltham Forest and is one of the six Waltham Forest wards of the Chingford and Woodford Green Constituency represented by Iain Duncan Smith MP.

The ward is represented at the council by three councillors with elections every four years.

The councillors elected in the 2018 election were:
 Nick Halebi, (Conservative)
 Andy Hemsted, (Conservative)
 Kay Isa, (Conservative)

At the 2011 Census the population of the Ward was 10,287.

Politics
Approximate result in  this ward for 2010 general election

Approximate result in  this ward for 2006 general election

References

External links
 Councillor Thom Goddard
 Councillor Andrew Hemsted
 Councillor Michael Lewis
 The Conservative Party

Wards of the London Borough of Waltham Forest